Fright Fest (also known as Festival Del Terror at Six Flags México) is a Halloween-oriented haunt event held annually at Six Flags theme parks in the United States, Canada, and Mexico. It mainly features haunted attractions, themed areas named Scare Zones, and live entertainment.

It opened as Fright Nights at Six Flags AstroWorld in 1986. In 2020, Fright Fest was reimagined to Hallowfest, due to the COVID-19 pandemic.

History

Fright Nights era (1986-1993)
After testing various Halloween-based seasonal events throughout the 1970s to mid-1980s, Six Flags, then owned by Bally Manufacturing, created an all-new Halloween event for AstroWorld in 1986 that they named Six Flags Fright Nights.

In 1987, the event began to be expanded to Six Flags' other properties. Six Flags Over Georgia was the second park to introduce the event.

Six Flags Over Mid-America was the third park to introduce Fright Nights in 1988 with Freddy Krueger from A Nightmare on Elm Street as the event's "entertainment chairman". The all-new Fright Nights featured House of the Living Dead, a walk-through inside of the ride building for the Time Tunnel dark ride, as well as the "Terror Train", a horror train show on the Tommy G. Robertson Railroad.

In 1989, Fright Nights debuted at Six Flags Over Texas. Like the parks in Texas and Missouri, Freddy Krueger was the central figure of the event. It featured haunted houses, a trick or treat trail for kids, and more.

Fright Fest era (1993-present)
In 1999, Six Flags licensed and opened Alice Cooper's Brutal Planet haunted houses at some parks, featuring music from the album and using similar elements in each house. The next year it became just simply "Brutal Planet" and dropped the Alice Cooper theme. Since then, Six Flags has licensed other intellectual properties for mazes and scare zones, including the Saw films and DC Comics's Suicide Squad.

In 2018, Fright Fest returned to Frontier City and Darien Lake, two former Six Flags parks re-acquired by the company on May 22, 2018.

To comply with the new health and safety protocols implemented by Six Flags due to the COVID-19 pandemic during 2020, the company announced that their Halloween event would be rebranded to Hallowfest. The change from Fright Fest to Hallowfest included no haunted houses or indoor shows. Six Flags Discovery Kingdom held a different event called Boo 2020! for the 2020 season, as the park operated as a zoo for the season to act in accordance with local government guidelines with the state.

In 2022, Six Flags introduced another Halloween event along-side Fright Fest, called Kids Boo Fest, a kids-oriented Halloween event with trick-or-treat trails along with in-park entertainment, that is held in mornings. On October 7, 2022, all Six Flags amusement parks implemented a new policy in which it limited the size of bags and subjected all bags to X-ray screening. While a reason for the change was not stated by the parks, an editor from the Theme Park Tribune said the new policies could be related to recent guest altercations, including shootings, at Kennywood and Six Flags Great America.

Attractions and shows
Six Flags parks are heavily decorated for Fright Fest, and mainly feature haunted attractions at an extra charge, as well as live entertainment and scare zones. Halloween-based shows are also performed, most notably "Love at First Fright" at Six Flags Great America, Six Flags St. Louis and Six Flags Over Texas, as well as opening ceremonies and closing finales such as "Freaks Unleashed" and "Final Freakout" at Six Flags St Louis which brings all the actors into the park for a first and last scare.

The parks also feature themed "Scare Zones" in designated areas of the park where costumed actors are allowed to scare guests, though these parks also typically include areas where the actors are not allowed, thus allowing a "safe" area for families with small children or otherwise not wanting to be scared.

Many of the parks have similar shows and share names and ideas, like "Dead Man's Party", which is at Six Flags St Louis, Six Flags New England, Six Flags Over Georgia, Six Flags Great Adventure and Six Flags Over Texas. "The Ringmaster's Cabaret" is another show, but is exclusively shown at Six Flags Great America.

Most also have a specific show that unleashes the monsters into the parks, including "Freaks Unleashed" at Six Flags St. Louis, "Awakening" at Six Flags Great Adventure and Six Flags Discovery Kingdom, "The Uprising" at Six Flags Over Georgia, Six Flags America, Six Flags Great America, "The Arrival" at Six Flags Fiesta Texas, and "Unleashed!" at Six Flags Magic Mountain.

Some parks also have their own respective characters that lead Fright Fest at their park, such as Dr. Diabolical at Six Flags Fiesta Texas and Nox at Six Flags Great America.

Locations

Awards
Fright Fest at Six Flags Magic Mountain has won USA Today's Reader's Choice Award for Best Theme Park Halloween Event twice, in 2016 and 2017. Additionally, Fright Fest for all parks has also been nominated for the same category in 2022, placing second place, behind Kings Island’s Halloween Haunt.

See also
 Holiday in the Park

Notes

References

External links
 Six Flags official Fright Fest website

Halloween events in the United States
Six Flags
Frontier City
La Ronde (amusement park)
Six Flags America
Six Flags AstroWorld
Six Flags Darien Lake
Six Flags Discovery Kingdom
Elitch Gardens Theme Park
Six Flags Fiesta Texas
Six Flags Great Adventure
Six Flags Great America
Kentucky Kingdom
Six Flags Magic Mountain
Six Flags México
Six Flags New England
Six Flags Over Georgia
Six Flags Over Texas
Six Flags St. Louis
The Great Escape and Hurricane Harbor